Monitor is an unincorporated community in Monroe County, West Virginia, United States. Monitor is located on U.S. Route 219, northeast of Union.

References

Unincorporated communities in Monroe County, West Virginia
Unincorporated communities in West Virginia